Sphaerus (c. 285 BC – c. 210 BC) of Borysthenes or the Bosphorus, was a Stoic philosopher.

Life
Sphaerus studied first under Zeno of Citium, and afterwards under Cleanthes. He taught in Sparta, where he acted as advisor to Cleomenes III. He moved to Alexandria at some point, (possibly when Cleomenes himself was exiled there in 222 BC) where he lived in the court of Ptolemy IV Philopator.

Ideas
Little survives of his works, but Sphaerus had a considerable reputation among the Stoics for the accuracy of his definitions.

Diogenes Laërtius and Athenaeus  tell a story of how he once saved himself from admitting that he had been deceived by a trick played upon him by King Ptolemy:

Writings
According to Diogenes Laërtius, Sphaerus wrote the following works:

 Περὶ κόσμου δύο – On the Universe (two books)
 Περὶ στοιχείων – On the Elements
 [Περὶ] σπέρματος – [On] Seed
 Περὶ τύχης – On Fortune
 Περὶ ἐλαχίστων – On the Smallest Things
 Πρὸς τὰς ἀτόμους καὶ τὰ εἴδωλα – Against Atoms and Images
 Περὶ αἰσθητηρίων – On the Senses
 Περὶ Ἡρακλείτου πέντε διατριβῶν – On Heraclitus (five lectures)
 Περὶ τῆς ἠθικῆς διατάξεως – On the Arrangement of Ethics
 Περὶ καθήκοντος – On Duty
 Περὶ ὁρμῆς – On Impulse
 Περὶ παθῶν δύο – On Passions (two books)
 Περὶ βασιλείας – On Kingship
 Περὶ Λακωνικῆς πολιτείας – On the Lacedaemonian Constitution
 Περὶ Λυκούργου καὶ Σωκράτους τρία – On Lycurgus and Socrates (three books)

 Περὶ νόμου – On Law
 Περὶ μαντικῆς – On Divination
 Διαλόγους ἐρωτικούς – Dialogues on Love
 Περὶ τῶν Ἐρετριακῶν φιλοσόφων – On the Eretrian Philosophers
 Περὶ ὁμοίων – On Things Similar
 Περὶ ὅρων – On Terms
 Περὶ ἕξεως – On Habits
 Περὶ τῶν ἀντιλεγομένων τρία – On Contradictions (three books)
 Περὶ λόγου – On Discourse
 Περὶ πλούτου – On Wealth
 Περὶ δόξης – On Glory
 Περὶ θανάτου – On Death
 Τέχνης διαλεκτικῆς δύο – Art of Dialectics (two books)
 Περὶ κατηγορημάτων – On Predicates
 Περὶ ἀμφιβολιῶν – On Ambiguity
 Ἐπιστολάς – Letters

Notes

References
 

Stoic philosophers
3rd-century BC Greek people
3rd-century BC philosophers
Ancient Pontic Greeks
Ptolemaic court
280s BC births
210s BC deaths